Kütralkura (from Mapudungun kütral, fire, and kura, stone, meaning "firestone") is a geopark in southern Chile's Araucanía Region. The geopark has an area of 8100 km2 and lies mostly in the Andes. It spans four communes: Curacautín, Lonquimay, Melipeuco and Vilcún. All of Conguillio National Park and Llaima, one of Chile's most active volcanoes, lie within the geopark.

By Mayy 17, 2018, Kütralkura was being considered for inclusion in the Global Geoparks Network. The inclusion in the network was confirmed and accepted on April 17, 2019, by UNESCO's executive board. The original geopark project was carried out and supported by the National Geology and Mining Service and CORFO.

The work done at Kütralkura is being used as template for a similar initiative in Palena Province.

References

External links
  
 Geotourism guide (Spanish)

Kütralkura 

Geoparks in Chile
Geology of Araucanía Region